RC Spartan Oradea (also known as RC Nágyvarad Spartans in Hungary) is an amateur Romanian rugby club based in Oradea. They currently play in the Nemzeti Bajnokság I of Hungary however, after having played in Romanian leagues until 2008. This makes them the second club outside of Hungary to play in the Hungarian league, after Slovakia`s Slovan Bratislava who first played in the tournament back in 2005.

History

The club was founded in 2005 by Mircea Țucudean, a former soldier and bodyguard who himself had played rugby while at the University of Oradea. Prior to the foundation of the club, the rugby team at the university managed to reach Divizia A, the second level of rugby in Romania, before disbanding a few years later.

In 2008, the club withdrew from the Romanian league to play in neighboring country Hungary, citing financial reasons and inconsistencies in refereeing. The Hungarian Rugby Union (MRgSz) welcomed them with open arms, as they saw the move as an attempt to help improve the quality of rugby in their country.

In 2011, Spartan Oradea promoted from the Nemzeti Bajnokság I the second division of rugby union in Hungary to the first division of rugby union in Hungary which was the DHL Extraliga.

Former squad

References

External links
 Official Website
 Facebook Page
 PlanetaOvala.ro - Romanian Rugby News

Sport in Oradea
Rugby clubs established in 2005
Romanian rugby union teams
2005 establishments in Romania